The 1936-37 season was Liverpool's 52nd season in existence, and the club finished in 18th place. The club also reached the third round of the FA Cup and were knocked out by Norwich City.

References 

1936-37
Liverpool